"Don't Need the Sun to Shine (to Make Me Smile)" is a song by English singer Gabrielle. It was written by Gabrielle and Jonathan Shorten for her greatest hits compilation Dreams Can Come True, Greatest Hits Vol. 1 (2001), spanning her first three albums. Produced by Shorten, the song served as the album's lead single and peaked at number nine on the UK Singles Chart, becoming her tenth top-ten hit in the United Kingdom. Outside the UK, it reached the top 20 in Denmark, New Zealand, and Portugal.

In popular culture
The song featured in several different scenes of the BBC black comedy series Nighty Night (2004–05).

Track listings

Charts

Weekly charts

Year-end charts

Release history

References

2001 singles
2001 songs
Gabrielle (singer) songs
Go! Beat singles
Songs written by Gabrielle (singer)
Songs written by Jonathan Shorten